Nick de Louw (born 9 February 1998) is a Dutch football player who plays for SV Someren.

Club career
He made his professional debut in the Eerste Divisie for Helmond Sport on 21 October 2016 in a game against De Graafschap.

References

External links
 

1998 births
People from Someren
Living people
Dutch footballers
Helmond Sport players
Eerste Divisie players
Association football midfielders
Footballers from North Brabant